Eugene Ernest Raesz Jr. (born November 20, 1940) is an American-born Canadian football player who played for the Edmonton Eskimos.

References

Living people
1940 births
Edmonton Elks players
American expatriates in Canada